Noqsan-e Kapari (also Romanized as Noqşān-e Kaparī) is a village in Jazmurian Rural District, Jazmurian District, Rudbar-e Jonubi County, Kerman Province, Iran. At the 2006 census, its population was 85, in 16 families.

References 

Populated places in Rudbar-e Jonubi County